Bank of the James Stadium, formerly Lynchburg City Stadium, is a ballpark located in Lynchburg, Virginia, United States, and the current home of the minor league Lynchburg Hillcats team. 

The baseball stadium was built in conjunction with an adjacent 6,000-person football stadium. The New York Yankees and the Brooklyn Dodgers played in the inaugural game at City Stadium on April 11, 1940, in front of an estimated crowd of 7,000. The following professional baseball teams have all fielded affiliates of their parent club in Lynchburg: the Washington Senators, St. Louis Cardinals, Chicago White Sox, Minnesota Twins, Texas Rangers, New York Mets, Boston Red Sox, Pittsburgh Pirates, Cincinnati Reds, and Atlanta Braves. The stadium is currently home to the Lynchburg Hillcats of the Carolina League, and is one of the oldest active ballparks in Minor League Baseball. The Hillcats have been an affiliate of the Cleveland Guardians since 2015. From 2010 to 2014 they were affiliated with the Atlanta Braves. In 2005, the Hillcats set an attendance record with a total of 151,266 fans passing through the gates.

Name
City Stadium opened in 1940. It was renovated and the field was renamed Calvin Falwell Field at City Stadium in 2004. In March 2020, the name was changed to Bank of the James Stadium when the city entered into a six-year naming rights deal worth $50,000 annually with Bank of the James, proceeds to be equally split between the city and the team.

Renovations
 
The stadium has had many major renovations since its inception in 1939. The first major renovation occurred in 1978. The renovation included reconstructing the outfield fence, grandstand roof, grandstand screen and adding new lights. In 1981, a clubhouse was added to accommodate both the football and baseball stadiums. In 2002 plans began for a $6.5 million renovation to Lynchburg City Stadium. The renovation included a complete renovation of the concourse with the addition of seat back chairs, and two picnic areas. The renovation also included the addition of two new concession stands, eight luxury boxes, a new press box, arcade room, spacious bathrooms and a state-of-the-art scoreboard. Prior to the 2005 season, six new luxury boxes were added in addition to a  video board in right field. In August 2004, the field was dedicated to Calvin F. Falwell, President of the Lynchburg Baseball Corporation since its inception in 1966.

References

External links
 
 Seating Chart | Lynchburg Hillcats
 Calvin Falwell Field at Lynchburg City Stadium (2004) – Ball Parks of the Minor Leagues
 Lynchburg City Stadium (pre-renovation) – Ball Parks of the Minor Leagues

Buildings and structures in Lynchburg, Virginia
Minor league baseball venues
Baseball venues in Virginia
Tourist attractions in Lynchburg, Virginia
1940 establishments in Virginia
Sports venues completed in 1940
Sports in Lynchburg, Virginia
Carolina League ballparks